The Murray River Open was a new addition to the ATP Tour in 2021.

Dan Evans won his maiden ATP title, defeating Félix Auger-Aliassime in the final, 6–2, 6–3. This was the seventh consecutive final loss of Auger-Aliassime's career.

Seeds
The top eight seeds received a bye into the second round. 

  Stan Wawrinka (quarterfinals, withdrew)
  Grigor Dimitrov (quarterfinals)
  Félix Auger-Aliassime (final)
  Borna Ćorić (quarterfinals)
  Casper Ruud (second round)
  Taylor Fritz (third round)
  Ugo Humbert (second round)
  Dan Evans (champion)

  Lorenzo Sonego (first round)
  Adrian Mannarino (second round)
  Marin Čilić (first round)
  Albert Ramos Viñolas (second round)
  Nick Kyrgios (third round)
  Richard Gasquet (first round)
  Tommy Paul (second round)
  Márton Fucsovics (second round)

Draw

Finals

Top half

Section 1

Section 2

Bottom half

Section 3

Section 4

References

Main draw

2021 ATP Tour